XHEJE-FM is a radio station on 96.3 FM in Dolores Hidalgo, Guanajuato. XHEJE carries a full service format known as Radio Reyna.

History
XHEJE began as XEJE-AM 1370, with a concession awarded on June 18, 1964. It was a 500-watt daytimer owned by Luis Ríos Castañeda. In 1983, the Reyna brothers got involved for the first time with the transfer of the station's concession to Alejandro Reyna García. Ten years later, it was transferred to Guadalupe López Montellano, and finally to a company owned by both families in 2000.

References

Spanish-language radio stations
Radio stations in Guanajuato
Radio stations established in 1964